The Tonopah Mining Company House is a historic house located on Queen Street in Tonopah, Nevada. The house was built in 1904 by the Tonopah Mining Company and served as a company house for its employees. The wood-frame house was designed in the Georgian Revival style. The house's design features an entrance porch topped by a gable, three chimneys, boxed eaves, and molded cornices.

The house was added to the National Register of Historic Places on May 20, 1982.

References

External links
Tonopah Mining Company of Nevada records at Hagley Museum and Library

Tonopah, Nevada
Houses in Nye County, Nevada
Houses completed in 1904
Houses on the National Register of Historic Places in Nevada
National Register of Historic Places in Tonopah, Nevada
Georgian Revival architecture in Nevada